Screamin' 4 Vengeance is the sixth studio album by  American rapper C-Murder (who was serving a life sentence at the Louisiana State Penitentiary for murder), released on July 1, 2008 on TRU Records and Asylum Records. Singles from the album include "Be Fresh" and "Posted on the Block (Remix)".

Track listing
"Intro" — 1:53
"I Represent" — 4:05
"Wtru" (Skit) — 0:28
"Be Fresh" (featuring Detroit Clean) — 4:26
"Posted on the Block (Remix)" (featuring Krayzie Bone, Papoose, Mia X & Verse) — 5:09
"Mihita" (featuring Mia X) — 4:34
"Gangstafied Lyrics" — 5:05
"Streets Keep Callin'" (featuring H. Double) — 4:16
"My Set" — 5:32
"Beastmode (featuring Verse, J. Lyric, Sincere Sosa & Chieffa) — 4:38
"Cuttboyz Anthem" (featuring Verse, Max Minelli & G. Dinero) — 4:56
"Freeze (Ice Man)" (featuring Max Minelli) — 3:35
"Down South" (featuring Slim Thug & C-Loc) — 4:43
"Murdaman Dance" — 4:43

References

Capitol Records albums
C-Murder albums
2008 albums